Faze is a multi-award-winning Nigerian solo artiste. Faze has been active in the music industry since 1995 first releasing albums as a member of the group Plantashun Boyz. Their first album was released in the year 2000. He has spawned 6 number 1 hits and 12 chart top 20 songs through his career as a solo artiste as well as 10 number 1 videos. This places Faze one of the best charted artiste in video charts. With sales of about 6 million units, Faze is one of the biggest selling Nigerian artists of all time. As at March, 2010 Faze was the first artiste to ever have all three albums released go platinum in Nigeria’s music history.
Faze has earned himself a name as the 'King of R&B' as referred to him by most journalists. He is arguably the best Nigerian vocalist having reached the highest vocal key note by any well- known Nigerian artiste. He was named Nigeria third best music idol by Vangurad Newspaper for the Year 2008. He was also listed by Bubbles Magazine as one of the 9 best performers of 2009.
His second album Independent holds the record for fastest sale before release date with over 1 million pre-orders, it is also referred to as one of Nigeria best R&B albums ever. Faze’s most successful singles include Kolomental, Originality, Need Somebody, Faze Alone, Loving you everyday and Tatoo Girls.

Albums

Studio albums

Music singles

Music videos

Discographies of Nigerian artists